Martin Ritchie Sharp  (21 January 1942 – 1 December 2013) was an Australian artist, cartoonist, songwriter and film-maker.

Career
Sharp was born in Bellevue Hill, New South Wales in 1942, and educated at Cranbrook private school, where one of his teachers was the artist Justin O'Brien. 

In 1960, Sharp enrolled at the National Art School at East Sydney.

He was one of the editors of Oz, an Australia/UK alternative/underground satire magazine published from 1963 to 1973 and associated with the international counterculture of that era.

Sharp was called Australia's foremost pop artist. He wrote the lyrics of the Cream song "Tales of Brave Ulysses," and created the cover art for Cream's Disraeli Gears and Wheels of Fire albums.

He designed at least two posters for Australia's premier contemporary circus, Circus Oz, including the 'World-famous'/'Non-Stop Energy' design.

Later interests
For most of the 1970s and beyond, Sharp's work and life was dominated by two major interests: Sydney's Luna Park and the entertainer Tiny Tim.

Luna Park
Sharp's involvement with the restoration of Luna Park in the 1970s proved a bittersweet experience.

In 1979, as pressure mounted to redevelop the prime harbourside site, a fire in the Luna Park Ghost Train claimed seven lives, including a father and his two sons. The fire was a turning point in Sharp's life; like many others he firmly believed that it was a deliberate act of terrorism aimed at destroying the park and making the site available for redevelopment. In a 2010 interview on the ABC Radio National program The Spirit of Things, he revealed that the fire and the circumstances surrounding it had exerted a profound effect on his spiritual outlook.

Tiny Tim
Sharp first saw performer Tiny Tim at the Royal Albert Hall in 1968 at the suggestion of Eric Clapton. From that time on, Tiny Tim was one of Sharp's strongest inspirations.

"Tim's appropriation of song is very much like my appropriation of images. We are both collagists taking the elements of different epochs and mixing them to discover new relationships."

"Eternity"
Sharp's work was celebrated in many exhibitions including a special Yellow House exhibition at the Art Gallery of NSW and a major retrospective at the Museum of Sydney which ran from October 2009 to March 2010.

Sydney Opera House
Sharp maintained a lifelong friendship with artist Lin Utzon, daughter of the Danish architect of the Sydney Opera House Jørn Utzon. The architect was controversially forced from his uncompleted masterpiece in 1966 and secretly left Australia with the aid of Sharp's mother.

In the mid-1990s, Sharp helped broker a reconciliation between the Sydney Opera House and Jørn Utzon, who subsequently developed a set of design principles to guide the building's future.

Death
Sharp inherited the heritage-listed house Wirian, in Victoria Road, Bellevue Hill, Sydney, in 1978. The house had been bought by Sharp's grandfather, Stuart Douglas Ritchie, a merchant, in 1937 for 20,000 pounds. Sharp lived there until he died from emphysema on 1 December 2013, at the age of 71.

See also
 Martin Sharp – Profile at MILESAGO
 Hapshash and the Coloured Coat
 Martin Sharp – Official website
 Guardian obituary by Marsha Rowe

References

Further reading
 Morgan, Joyce. Martin Sharp: His Life and Times. Allen & Unwin, Sydney, 2017. 

1942 births
2013 deaths
Australian cartoonists
Australian contemporary artists
Australian songwriters
Psychedelic artists
Underground cartoonists
Album-cover and concert-poster artists
Members of the Order of Australia
Artists from Sydney
National Art School alumni
Deaths from emphysema
People educated at Cranbrook School, Sydney
Australian expatriates in the United Kingdom
Australian painters
20th-century Australian musicians
Writers from Sydney